

Franz Westhoven (7 December 1894  – 9 October 1983) was a German general in the Wehrmacht during World War II who commanded several panzer divisions.  He was a recipient of the Knight's Cross of the Iron Cross of Nazi Germany.

Westhoven served in the Army personnel office at the start of World War II, where he had been from 1934 to 1940, and then took command of the 1st Rifle Regiment in October 1941 as an oberst (colonel) (promoted on 1 November 1939), and led this unit into Operation Barbarossa as part of 1st Panzer Division in Army Group North. In February 1942, he took command of the 3rd Rifle Brigade, which later became the 3rd Panzergrendier Brigade. He was given command of the 3rd Panzer Division on 1 October 1942, and was promoted to generalleutnant on 1 May 1943, but was wounded in action on 20 October 1943.

Returning to active service on 1 February 1944, he served as an advisor under his mentor Leo Geyr von Schweppenburg in Panzer Group West, had two brief deputy commands in France (21st Panzer Division from 8 March to 8 May 1944, and 2nd Panzer Division from 5 May until 26 May 1944), and ended the war in the roles of deputy inspector general of panzer troops (August 1944 – 1945) and commander of tank schools (1945).

Awards

 Knight's Cross of the Iron Cross on  25 October 1943 as generalleutnant and commander of 3rd Panzer Division

References

Citations

Bibliography

 
 
 
 

1894 births
1983 deaths
People from Ludwigshafen
People from the Palatinate (region)
Lieutenant generals of the German Army (Wehrmacht)
Recipients of the clasp to the Iron Cross, 1st class
Recipients of the Gold German Cross
Recipients of the Knight's Cross of the Iron Cross
Prussian Army personnel
Reichswehr personnel
Military personnel from Rhineland-Palatinate